In heraldry, an ordinary is a one of the two main types of charges, beside the mobile charges. An ordinary is a simple geometrical figure, bounded by straight lines and running from side to side or top to bottom of the shield. There are also some geometric charges known as subordinaries, which have been given lesser status by some heraldic writers, though most have been in use as long as the traditional ordinaries.  Diminutives of ordinaries and some subordinaries are charges of the same shape, though thinner. Most of the ordinaries are theoretically said to occupy one-third of the shield; but this is rarely observed in practice, except when the ordinary is the only charge (as in the coat of arms of Austria).

The terms ordinary and subordinary are somewhat controversial, as they have been applied arbitrarily and inconsistently among authors, and the use of these terms has been disparaged by some leading heraldic authorities.  In his Complete Guide to Heraldry (1909), Arthur Charles Fox-Davies asserted that the terms are likely inventions of heraldic writers and not of heralds, arguing the "utter absurdity of the necessity for any [such] classification at all," and stating that the ordinaries and sub-ordinaries are, in his mind, "no more than first charges."

Types

Ordinaries 

Ordinaries (sometimes called "honourable ordinaries") resemble partitions of the field, but are formally considered objects on the field. Though there is some debate as to exactly which geometrical charges—with straight edges and running from edge to edge of the shield—constitute ordinaries, certain ones are agreed on by everyone. Except for the chief they are central to the shield. Ordinaries should not be mixed with Division of the field.

Cross: a pale and a fess of equal widths conjoined (though the cross is typically thinner than this would suggest), as in the arms of the City of London.
Pale: a vertical stripe right down the middle of the shield. Typically  to  the width of the field.
 A variant is the Canadian pale, invented in 1964 for the new Canadian national flag: it takes up half the width of the field.
 Fess: a horizontal stripe, as in the coat of arms of Austria. Typically  to  the height of the field.
 Bar: a narrower fess (said in theory to occupy one-fifth of the field), sometimes reckoned as an ordinary in its own right. It is rarely borne singly.
Bend: an oblique band from the dexter chief (the bearer's upper right, viewer's upper left) to the opposite corner, as in the arms of the former grand duchy of Baden.
Bend sinister: a bend in the opposite direction (sinister chief to dexter base).
Chevron: two diagonal bands meeting in the centre in the form of an inverted V, or like the beams of a gable; as in the arms of Udine, Italy, or Trans, Switzerland.
Saltire: a bend and a bend sinister both of equal widths conjoined to form a diagonal cross (×), as in the Scots national banner (often referred to simply as "the Saltire"), and also known colloquially as a St Andrew's cross.
Chief: a horizontal band right across the top of the shield, as in the arms of the district of Lausanne (Vaud, Switzerland).
 Chief triangular begins in the corners and extends to a point that is one quarter to one third the way down the shield. It is a complex line division variant of a chief.
 Chief enarched is drawn with a concave arch
 Chief double-arched has two concavities
Terrace in base (French: champagne, terrace; Italian campagna; German  Schildfuß)
Mount when represented in green and curved or arched, as a hill.
Mount mounted, or Shapournet shapourned: a trimount.

Ordinaries or subordinaries 
The following are sometimes classed as ordinaries, sometimes as subordinaries (see below):
Bordure: the boundary of the shield; often used for cadency
Pile: downward pointing triangle, issuing from the top of the shield
Pall or Pairle: a Y-shape
A variant is the shakefork: a pall cut short of the margins, with pointed ends. It is frequent in Scotland, owing to its prominence in the armoury of Clan Cunningham.

Subordinaries 
Some geometric figures are not considered to be "honourable ordinaries" and are called "subordinaries". Very loosely, they are geometric or conventional charges that, unlike ordinaries, do not stretch from edge to edge of the shield. There is no definitive list or definition, but they generally include:

Fixed subordinaries 
Fixed subordinaries are those that have a particular place to go on a shield—or at least a very limited range of places.

 Quarter: the dexter chief quadrant of the shield
 Canton: smaller than the quarter, formally said to occupy one-ninth of the shield, though sometimes drawn smaller, but generally accepted as a square 1/3 the width of the shield. The canton is often said to be the quarter's diminutive, but perhaps it should be treated as a subordinary in its own right as it fulfils heraldic functions not fulfilled by the quarter, and behaves according to its own special rules—as for example in the case of the canton on which baronets in the UK may display the badges of their 'rank', which is very rarely shown occupying such a large area as the upper left third of the field, and is usually much less and very often shown not as square but as a rectangle with its longer side vertical. Very occasionally a 'sinister canton' is found, on the shield's other side.
 Flaunches, always borne in pairs: a circular arc emerging out of each flank of the shield.
 Fret: interlacing bendlet, bendlet sinister and mascle.
 Gore: two arcs meeting in the fess point to form a triangular segment.
 Gyron: the lower half of a quarter cut diagonally, said to be an old charge but rare although there are modern examples (e. g. de Cluseau)
 Orle: A bordure separated from the outside of the shield. Like the bordure the orle takes on the shape of the shield or flag it is on. Although the orle's diminutive is the tressure, there are examples of "fillet orles" (orles narrower than usual). It is often said that an orle may not have other charges charged on it, but the Scots Public Register. When a number of charges are arranged as if on a bordure, they are said to be in orle or to form an orle of such charges.
 Tressure: a thinner version and hence diminutive of the orle. The most famous tressure is probably the double tressure flory counter flory in the royal coat of arms of Scotland. Tressures with other ornamentation exist, such as with maple leaves, crescents, thistles and roses.

Mobile subordinaries 

Other subordinaries can be placed anywhere on the field.

 Escutcheon: a shield used as a charge.

escutcheon of pretence or en surtout—When one escutcheon is borne in the centre of the coat, it is sometimes called an inescutcheon or an escutcheon of pretence or an escutcheon en surtout. Such centrally placed escutcheons usually have some particular significance. For example, in arms of dominion an inescutcheon typically shows the dynastic arms of the prince, whose possessions are shown in the quarters of the main shield; current examples include the arms of the Danish Royal Family, with an inescutcheon of the house of Oldenburg, and the coat of arms of Spain, with an inescutcheon of the house of Bourbon-Anjou. In Scots heraldry the escutcheon en surtout serves several different purposes. This all comes under the heading of marshalling.
 Lozenge: a rhombus with its long axis upright, resembling the diamond of playing-cards.
 Fusil: a thin lozenge; very much taller than it is wide.
 Mascle: a voided lozenge (i.e. with a largish lozenge shaped hole)
 Rustre (very rare): a lozenge pierced (i.e. with a smallish round hole)

 Roundel: a disc or ball, as in the arms of the Duchy of Cornwall or of the Medici. In the Anglophone heraldries differently coloured roundels have different names, e.g. a roundel or is called a bezant and a roundel azure is called a hurt. French heraldry solely distinguishes besants (roundels of a metal tincture) and tourteaux (roundels of a colour tincture): hence, the Canadian Francophone versions of blazons follow suit — Anglophone hurt is Francophone tourteau d'azur, and Anglophone bezant is a besant d'or
 Annulet: a voided roundel (i.e. with a largish round hole, resembling a ring)

 Billet: a small rectangle, resembling a brick or a letter.  Billets are normally vertical (as in the arms of the Kingdom of the Netherlands), but can be horizontal (as in the arms of Friesland).

Variations

Lines 

Ordinaries need not be bounded by straight lines.

Diminutives 
When a coat of arms contains two or more of an ordinary, they are nearly always blazoned (in English) as diminutives of the ordinary, as follows.

Diminutives of the pale 
 pallet: theoretically half the width of a pale.
 endorse: half the width of a pallet; also found in pairs on either side of a pale when the term "endorsed" is used

Diminutives of the fess 
 bar, see above.
 barrulet, narrower than both.
 hamade (also called hamaide or hummet): a bar couped which doesn't reach the edges of the shield, usually in threes

Diminutives of the bend 
 bendlet, half the width of a bend.
 ribbon or riband, half the width of a bendlet, occasionally called a cost
 baton: a bendlet couped which doesn't reach the edges of the shield, often said to be only a bendlet sinister couped, but has certainly been used as a couped bendlet 'dexter' since the 17th century at the latest

Diminutive of the bend sinister 
 bendlet sinister, half the width of a bend sinister, also very occasionally called a scarpe;
baton sinister, a bendlet sinister couped

Diminutives of the chevron 
 chevronel: half the width of a chevron.
couple close: half the width of a chevronnel, but only to be found in pairs with a chevron between them; the phrase 'a chevron between two couple closes' has the alternative 'a chevron couple closed'; in essence the same as cottising a chevron; couple close is not found much in modern blazons

Diminutives of the chief 
 comble, "half" a chief; rare in the Anglophone heraldries, but does appear in the civic heraldry of France—there even being at least one chief charged with a comble
 chief enhanced, again "half" a chief, sometimes said not to be a diminutive, but is indistinguishable from the comble which is.
 fillet: said, by those who do not believe in the comble or chief enhanced, to be the nearest that the chief comes to having a diminutive, which is effectively a barrulet conjoined to a chief at its bottom edge—blazoned either as 'a chief supported by a fillet' or as 'a chief filleted' (or things similar); occasionally appears in its own right—though it is then very little other than a barrulet enhanced.

Diminutive of the cross 
 cross fillet (or fillet cross), somewhat less than half the width of a cross.

Diminutive of the saltire 
 fillet saltire, something less than half the width of a saltire
 saltorel, is sometimes said to be a diminutive saltire, but is best thought of simply as a saltire couped, the word being sometimes used when there are three or more (rather like lioncel and eaglet were used at times when there were three or more lions or eagles in a coat)—a 19th-century armorial uses 'saltorels' only once for every ten or eleven 'saltires'.  A common charge in Dutch heraldry.

Cottise and cottising 

The cottise (the spelling varies—sometimes only one t and sometimes c instead of the s) originated as an alternative name to cost (see above) and so as a diminutive of the bend, most commonly found in pairs on either side of a bend, with the bend being blazoned either as between two cottises or as cottised.

Nowadays cottising is used not just for bends but for practically all the ordinaries (and occasionally collections of charges), and consists in placing the ordinary between two diminutive versions of itself (and occasionally other things). A pale so treated is usually blazoned endorsed and a chevron very occasionally couple closed or between two couple closes. A chief, however, cannot be cottised.

The ordinary and its cottices need not have the same tincture or the same line ornamentation.

Ordinaries very occasionally get cottised by things shaped quite differently from their diminutives—like demi maple leaves.

Occasionally a collection of charges aligned as if on an ordinary—in bend, etc.—is accompanied by cotticing.

Voiding, surmounting with another, and fimbriation 
Any type of charge, but probably most often the ordinaries and subordinaries, can be "voided"; without further description, this means that a hole in the shape of the charge reveals the field behind it. Occasionally the hole is of different tincture or shape (which must then be specified), so that the charge appears to be surcharged with a smaller charge.

Notes

References
 Boutell, Charles (1983). Boutell's Heraldry. Revised J P Brook-Little, Norroy and Ulster King of Arms. London and New York: Frederick Warne.
 Fox-Davies, Arthur Charles (1986, first published 1904). The Art of Heraldry: An Encyclopædia of Armory London: Bloomsbury Books.
 Fox-Davies, Arthur Charles (1909). A Complete Guide to Heraldry. New York: Dodge Pub. Co. . 
 Greaves, Kevin (2000). A Canadian Heraldic Primer. Ottawa: The Heraldry Society of Canada. . 
 Sir Thomas Innes of Learney, Lord Lyon King of Arms (1978). Scots Heraldry. Revised Malcolm R Innes of Edingight, Marchmont Herald. London and Edinburgh: Johnston and Bacon. 
 Mackinnon of Dunakin, Charles (1966). The Observer's Book of Heraldry. London: Frederick Warne.
 Nisbet, Alexander (1984, first published 1722). A system of heraldry. Edinburgh: T & A Constable.
 Sir James Balfour Paul, Lord Lyon King of Arms (1969, first published 1903). An Ordinary of Arms Contained in the Public Register of All Arms and Bearings in Scotland (2nd edition, paperback reprint). Baltimore: Genealogical Publishing Co.
 David Reid of Robertland and Vivien Wilson (1977). An Ordinary of Arms, volume 2 [1902-1973]. Edinburgh: Lyon Office.
 Urquhart, R M (1979). Scottish Civic Heraldry: Regional - Islands - District. London: Heraldry Today. .

External links

Canadian Heraldic Authority
pall—College of New Caledonia (Prince George, British Columbia): Azure on a pall Or five cross crosslets fitchée Gules in chief an open book Argent binding and fore-edges Or.
 Blair Keith Churchill: Purpure a lion rampant within a double tressure erablé-counter-erablé Or.
 tressure—Odile Gravereaux Calder: Azure a rose Argent seeded Or barbed Vert within a tressure flory inward Argent.
pallets—Niagara Herald Extraordinary, badge: On a compass rose of sixteen points Gules, a plate fimbriated Gules charged with three pallets wavy Azure.
 Municipality of Sainte-Apolline-de-Patton, Quebec: Azure on a bend between in chief a sun in splendour and in base a circular saw blade Or, a bendlet wavy Azure.
voided—Town of Lacombe: Or a cross Gules voided throughout of the field between in the first quarter a Mountain Bluebird (Sialia currucoides) volant bendwise Azure, in the second an open book Argent bound Azure, in the third a cross flory Azure voided of the field and charged with a cross couped Gules, and in the fourth two bendlets and two bendlets sinister interlaced Azure.
 City of Abbotsford: Vert a cross and saltire merged Or voided Azure and over all in centre point a bezant charged with a strawberry flower proper.
 cottised—Fr. Marc Edward Smith: Azure on a fess cottised Or an open book Argent edged Or bound Azure clasped Argent in chief a Loyalist civil coronet and in base a cross formy Or.
cotised—Regional Municipality of Niagara: Vert on a fess Argent coticed Or fracted per pale lowered dexter raised sinister twelve chevrons couched dexter Azure in dexter chief a representation of the Royal Crown Or.
cotised—St George's Society of Toronto: Argent a cross cotised by eight demi maple leaves Gules.
cotised—Commemorative Distinction Gulf of St Lawrence (flag): Gules on a Canadian Pale wavy Argent cotised to the interior Azure, a maple leaf composed of flames proper charged with a gridiron Azure.
cotised—John Stewart Archibald LeForte: Argent on a bend bretessed Azure cotised Sable between in chief and in base a Latin cross fleury Gules a key ward upwards between two fleurs-de-lys all bendwise Or — illustrating that both the tinctures and the lines of an ordinary and its cotises are independent of each other.

U. S. Army Institute of Heraldry
sinister canton—11th Field Artillery Regiment, USA: an example of a sinister canton, bearing the badge of the 'parent' regiment.
fusils—US Army 72nd Signal Battalion: Per pale Sable and Gules, a fleur-de-lis throughout Or between in chief two fusils pilewise and in fess two mullets Argent.
bendlets sinister—7th Infantry Regiment, USA: Per fess Argent and Azure, a fess embattled to chief Or masoned Sable between in chief a field gun Gules on a mount Vert and in base three bendlets sinister of the first.
chief enhanced—244th Quartermaster Battalion: Buff, a wheel Argent between dexter and sinister flanks Vert and Gules, on a chief enhanced Azure a chain of three links fesswise of the second. Here the flanks are straight rather than being their cousins the curved flaunches.
chief with a fillet—U.S.Army 121st Support Battalion: Per bend Buff and Gules a bend Or, a cross and ball peen hammer saltirewise superimposed in base by a stylized mechanized track Sable; on a chief per fess dancetty of three Azure (light Blue) and of the third with the dexter and sinister peaks diminutive, a mullet on the dexter peak Argent, on the lower part of chief a fillet of the fourth.

Heraldry Society of Scotland
 Royal Burgh of Annan Community Council: Or; a saltire and chief gules, on the latter five barrulets wavy conjoined, alternately argent and azure.
 Kilsyth Community Council, Scotland: Quarterly, azure and gules: first, an open bible proper; second, two swords in saltire argent, hilts uppermost, or; third, two shuttles in saltire or, garnished with thread argent; fourth, a miner's lamp argent, enflamed proper; over all a fillet cross, nowy lozengy, argent.

Royal Heraldry Society of Canada
 Suan-Seh Foo MD: Argent semé bottony Sable a pall reversed Gules cotised Azure, over all a rod of Aesculapius surmounting a mahlstick and a paint brush in saltire Or.
 William Neil Fraser: Azure between three cinquefoils a chevron Argent masoned Sable voided of the field and charged thereon with a trillium flower between two dogwood flowers proper.
 Michael Greenwood: Sable, a chevron Erminois cotised between three saltires couped and within a bordure Or.
 Comm. Daniel Leonard Norris: Azure a pall  and pale merged wavy Or voided wavy of the field cotised wavy Or.

Civic Heraldry of England and Wales
 Newquay Town Council: Or on a Saltire Azure four Herrings respectant Argent.
 Blaenavon Town Council: Quarterly wavy Sable and Or in the first and fourth quarters a Key wards upwards and to the dexter and in the second and third quarters a Lozenge all counterchanged.
 Harlow District Council: Vert between three Lozenges Argent a Pair of Dividers Or enfiled by a Mural Crown also Argent two Flaunches of the last each charged with a Mascle Gules.
 Barnard Castle Town Council: Gules in chief a Castle and in base a Cross formy the uppermost limb between a Crescent and an Estoile of seven rays all within an Orle Argent.
 Hinckley and Bosworth Borough Council: Per pale indented Argent and Gules on a Chief Or three Torteaux that in the centre charged with a Pierced Cinquefoil Ermine the others each charged with a Mascle Or.
 Darlington Borough Council: Per pale Azure and Gules on a Chevron Argent between in chief a representation of St. Cuthbert's Cross proper and a Shorthorn Bull's Head caboshed and in base a Garb Or enfiled by a Circlet of Steel proper a Chevronel wavy Azure on a Chief Argent a representation of the Steam Engine "Locomotion" and a Tender proper.
 Former Hawarden Rural District Council, a rare example of a single bar.
 Former Gower Rural District Council: Barry wavy of eight Argent and Azure on a Pile Azure a Lion rampant between three Cross Crosslets Or.
 Former Ashby de la Zouch Rural District Council: the crest includes a Banner paly of six Gold and Azure a Quarter Ermine.
 Former Billingham Urban District Council, showing a canton filling one-ninth of the shield.
 Former Merton and Morden Urban District Council: Sable a Fret Or on a Chief of the last two Lions passant respectant of the field.
 Former Ampthill Rural District Council: Or a Stag's Head Gules between the attires an Escutcheon Azure charged with three Bars wavy of the first encircled by a Chaplet of Oak fructed proper on a Chief Sable a Lion passant guardant Gold.
 Former Blackwell Rural District Council: Argent a Pickaxe surmounted by a Spade the hafts upwards in saltire proper within an Orle of Pellets on a Chief Sable three Stag's Heads caboshed of the Field.
 Former Beddington and Wallington Borough Council: Argent a Fess embattled between three roses Gules each surmounted by a Rose Argent barbed and seeded proper the Fess surmounted by an Escutcheon Azure charged with a representation of an Hannibal Aircraft volant Argent and in base a rising Sun Or all within a Bordure compony Or and Azure.
 Former Chelsea Metropolitan Borough Council: Gules within a Cross voided Or a Crozier in pale of the last in the first quarter a winged Bull statant in the second a Lion rampant reguardant both Argent in the third a Sword point downwards proper pomel and hilt Gold between two Boars' Heads couped at the neck of the third and in the fourth a Stag's Head caboshed of the second..

Other sites
 Braemar Royal Highland Society, Scotland: Per fess enhanced wavy or and argent; in chief issuant out of a fillet wavy azure four demi lions combatant, two and two gules, and in base a Scots fir tree in pale, seeded, proper, growing out of a mound purpure, between on the dexter an eagle displayed azure, armed beaked and membered gules, on its breast an antique covered cup or and charged with a three point label also gules, and on the sinister an eagle displayed sable armed beaked and membered gules.
 Newton Technical High School, South Africa: Quarterly gules and sable; a lozenge or voided of a quatrefoil; at its centre a cog wheel argent; the whole within a bordure or.